MoD Shoeburyness is a military installation at Pig's Bay near Shoeburyness in Essex.

History

In 1849, the Board of Ordnance purchased land at South Shoebury with a view to setting up an artillery testing and practice range (until then, Plumstead Common and Woolwich Common had been used, but these were no longer viable due to the increasing power and range of the weapons.)

The 'Old Ranges'
Initially, the range was only used in the summer, but its use grew significantly during the Crimean War and from 1854 it was established as a permanent station. The officers' mess was set up in a former Coastguard station on what is now Mess Road, facing the sea; officers were accommodated in the terrace of coastguard cottages, to which a library and dining room were added in 1852. A simple 'hut barracks' was also built on the seafront, to the north-east (on what is now Parade Walk); and in 1856 a garrison hospital was established nearby. The ranges and practice areas were laid out to the west.

RA School of Gunnery

In the wake of the Crimean War, the Royal Artillery School of Gunnery was established at Shoeburyness in 1859 'for individual improvement as well as for the advancement of artillery science in general'. Horseshoe Barracks and various other amenities were added not long afterwards and the site was extended to cover some 200 acres lying between Ness Road and the coast.

Over the years that followed Shoeburyness was integral to the development of new and improved artillery weapons. Alongside its use as a training facility, the ranges were used for experimental trials of guns, rockets and explosives and for the testing of armour and defensive works. As the scale of these experiments began to outgrow the site, its gun emplacements were adapted for seaward firing and it later specialized in coastal artillery training.

A branch of the School was opened in Woolwich, in the 1870s, which took over the training of Militia and Volunteer Artillery (with a view to ensuring a standardisation of training across both the Reserve and the Regular forces).

An accidental explosion in February 1885 killed seven Royal Artillery personnel including the Commandant and his deputy.

After 1889, experimentation and testing was progressively moved on to 'New Ranges' to the north-east, but the 'Old Ranges' remained in active use as a training area.

The 'New Ranges'
As early as 1865 the Ordnance Select Committee was recommending the purchase of additional land at Shoeburyness, to accommodate the increasing power and range of artillery then in development. In due course land was acquired to the north-east, and from 1889 the establishment expanded on to a 'New Range', which encompassed Foulness and Havengore.

Proof and Experimental Establishment

The Experimental Branch (part of the School of Gunnery since 1859) became an independent operation in 1905 (it was renamed the Experimental Establishment in 1920, and the Proof and Experimental Establishment (P&EE) in 1948, before becoming part of the Defence Test and Evaluation Organisation (DTEO) in 1995).

The Coast Artillery School
In 1920 the School of Gunnery was redesignated as the 'Coast Artillery School' of the Royal Garrison Artillery, following the move of the Field Artillery and Horse Artillery equivalents to a new establishment (the School of Instruction for Royal Horse and Field Artillery) at Larkhill. In 1940 the Coast Artillery School was moved from Shoebury to Great Orme, Llandudno, where it remained for the rest of the Second World War, before relocating to Plymouth.

Shoebury Garrison

After the war, artillery and other regiments continued to be garrisoned at Shoebury until 1976 when the garrison headquarters closed. At the same time, the number of military personnel on the staff of the P&EE was reduced, especially in the 1980s, as civilian contractors increasingly took over the running of the Establishment.

Following the closure of the Old Ranges in 1998 the old garrison land and buildings were sold and converted for housing. The New Ranges remain in use, however; the work of the Experimental Establishment, begun in 1859, continues today under the auspices of Qinetiq. The site is known as MoD Shoeburyness.

Present-day use

Active military site
Qinetiq manages the site on behalf of the Ministry of Defence and "provides defence Test and Evaluation (T & E), and training support services which help ensure the safety and effectiveness of munitions and skills used by the UK Armed Services". In particular, the site provides a closed and controlled environment for testing weapons systems at various stages of development, for safe disposal of expired ammunition and for live-ammunition training in Explosive Ordnance Disposal techniques.

Former military site
Several buildings and structures on the site are listed; together they are described by Historic England as constituting "a complete mid-19th century barracks". As of 2016 many of these have been refurbished for sale as private houses, and additional housing is being built in the vicinity. A tower was planned to stand in the Shoeburyness Garrison housing development. The tower was to be 18 storeys high and designed to mark the start of the Thames Gateway development.

Gallery

References

Sources

Installations of the British Army
Barracks in England
Buildings and structures in Southend-on-Sea